Creangă is a surname common in Romania and Moldova. Used alone, it may refer to any of the following:
Ion Creangă, Romanian writer and schoolteacher 
Ion Creangă (politician), Bessarabian politician 
Ion Creangă (jurist), Moldovan jurist 
Horia Creangă, Romanian architect, grandson of the writer
Şerban Creangă, Romanian director

See also
Ion Creangă, Neamț, a Romanian village
Ion Creangă, a defunct Romanian magazine
Ion Creangă Children's Theatre, a Romanian theatrical institution
Ion Creangă National College, an educational institution in Romania
Ion Creangă Pedagogical State University, an educational institution in Moldova
Editura Ion Creangă, a defunct Romanian publishing house

See also 
 Creanga River (disambiguation)

Romanian-language surnames